Thomas Merke (or Merks; died 1409) was an English priest and Bishop of Carlisle from 1397 to 1400.

Educated at Oxford University, Merke became a Benedictine monk at Westminster Abbey and was consecrated bishop about 23 April 1397. He served Richard II as ambassador to various German princes in 1397, was one of the commissioners who negotiated the dowry of Isabella of Valois in 1398, and accompanied the king to Ireland in 1399.

Merke supported Richard against the usurper Henry IV and in 1400 was imprisoned in the Tower of London and deprived of his bishopric as a result. Although released and conditionally pardoned the following year, he was not restored to the bishopric, but served as an auxiliary Bishop and as the acting bishop of the Diocese of Winchester several times. He was one of the Bishops who sided against Pope Gregory XII at Lucca in 1408, during the Great Schism of the West. He died in 1409.

Merke's role in supporting the king is represented in Samuel Daniel's poem The Civil Wars Between the Houses of Lancaster and York and in William Shakespeare's play Richard II.

Citations

References

Bishops of Carlisle
English Benedictines
1409 deaths
14th-century English Roman Catholic bishops
15th-century English people
Male Shakespearean characters
Year of birth unknown